Gelah Sur (also Romanized as Gelah Sūr, Galehsūr, and Geleh Sūr) is a village in Saral Rural District, Saral District, Divandarreh County, Kurdistan Province, Iran. At the 2006 census, its population was 250, in 50 families. The village is populated by Kurds.

References 

Towns and villages in Divandarreh County
Kurdish settlements in Kurdistan Province